0V (zero V) or 0-V may refer to:

0v, or zero volts, a complete lack of voltage
Zero-voltage switching; see Switched-mode power supply
0 vector, or null vector, a vector where all components are zero
0 vector space; see Examples of vector spaces
0-velocity surface, or Zero-velocity surface

See also
V0 (disambiguation)